Emma Louise Jones (born 21 August 1982) is a footballer who plays for the Welsh national team and the women's section of Cardiff City FC. Jones plays as a central defender and has accumulated a half-century of caps for Wales.

Club career
Jones played for Newport Strikers, Newport County and Merthyr Tydfil prior to joining Bristol Rovers in 2003. The club changed its name to Bristol Academy two years later. Her nickname at the Gas Girls was "Vinnie".

In the mid–season break of the 2011 FA WSL, Jones left Bristol to sign for Liverpool.

In February 2012 Jones returned to Wales, signing for Cardiff City's affiliated women's team, who play in the South Wales League.

International career
Jones won six caps for Wales at U16 level and scored three goals in 15 games for the U18 team. She made her senior debut, aged 17, in a 6–0 defeat to Belgium in March 2000.

References

External links
Emma Jones at UEFA (Archive copy: 5 November 2013)
Emma Jones at FAW (Archive copy: 21 March 2009)

1982 births
Living people
Bristol Academy W.F.C. players
Liverpool F.C. Women players
Wales women's international footballers
FA Women's National League players
Women's Super League players
Women's association football defenders
Welsh women's footballers